Comitas torquayensis is an extinct species of sea snail, a marine gastropod mollusc in the family Pseudomelatomidae.

Description

Distribution
This extinct marine species was found in lower Miocene strata off Torquay, Victoria, Australia. The type specimen is in the Auckland Museum.

References

 A.W.B. Powell (1944), The Australian Tertiary Mollusca of the Family Turridae
 A.W.B. Powell (1944), Records of the Auckland Institute and Museum., vol. 3 no. 1, p. 1-68

External links
 Auckland Museum: Comitas torquayensis (holotype)

torquayensis
Gastropods described in 1944
Gastropods of Australia